The 2017–18 Troy Trojans men's basketball team represented Troy University during the 2017–18 NCAA Division I men's basketball season. The Trojans, led by fifth-year head coach Phil Cunningham, played their home games at Trojan Arena in Troy, Alabama as members of the Sun Belt Conference. They finished the season 16–17, 9–9 in Sun Belt play to finish in a three-way tie for fifth place. They defeated South Alabama in the first round of the Sun Belt tournament before losing in the quarterfinals to Georgia State.

Previous season
The Trojans finished the 2016–17 season 22–15, 20–8 in Sun Belt play to finish in a three-way tie for sixth place. They defeated Appalachian State, Georgia Southern, Georgia State and Texas State to win the Sun Belt tournament. As a result, the Trojans received the conference's automatic bid to the NCAA tournament as a No. 15 seed. They lost in the first round to Duke

Off-season

Departures

Incoming recruits

Roster

Schedule and results

|-
!colspan=9 style=| Exhibition

|-
!colspan=9 style=| Non-conference regular season

|-
!colspan=9 style=| Sun Belt Conference regular season

|-
!colspan=9 style=| Sun Belt tournament

References

2017-18
2017 in sports in Alabama
2018 in sports in Alabama
2017–18 Sun Belt Conference men's basketball season